Geoffroy Dauvergne (29 October 1922, Flers, Orne – 1977, Saint-Lunaire) was a French painter. He died of accidental causes after falling from the rocks at Pointe du Décollé.

1922 births
1977 deaths
People from Orne
20th-century French painters
20th-century French male artists
French male painters